E314 or E-314 may be:
 Guaiacum, a food additive
 European route E314, a European route class B road connecting the Belgian city of Leuven with the German city of Aachen